Dressage To Win (盛裝舞步愛作戰) is a nine-episode Hong Kong television series created by TVB in celebration of the 2008 Olympics held in Beijing. The series revolves around 12 students attending horse-riding school in the hopes to get a scholarship to go to England.

Dressage To Win is part of the Four Leaf Clover TVB series and guest stars many TVB actors and singers throughout.

Plot
Twelve students compete to win a scholarship to England for horseback riding. The story's main couple includes Ben and Michelle who were lovers but, due to a misunderstanding, they broke up. A few years later they meet up again at horseback riding camp competing with each for the scholarship. Other couples include Kimmy and Ah Him, and couple Nel and Ah Boy who are complete opposites of each other. As the competition heats up so does the love between these students.

Cast
Michelle Wai as Michelle
Ken Hung as Ben
Carlos Chan as Nel
Wylie Chiu as Boy
Him Law as Ah Him
Kimmy Kwan as Kimmy
Ryan Lam as Peter
Katy Kung as Mary
Andy Hui as Siu Ma
Mandy Lieu as Mandy
Vanko Wong as Mei Mei
Phoebe Chan as Phoebe
Renee Lee as Renee
Kimasa Kwok as Kimasa
Bill Chan as principal
Andy Hui as Siu Ma
Tracy Ip Mrs. Dai Ma
Mandy Lieu as Mandy
Ivan Wang as Hero Sir
William So as William So

Guests
Episode 1

Episode 2

Episode 3

Episode 4

Episode 5

Episode 6

Episode 7

Episode 8

TVB dramas